This is the list of companies that manufacture cement in Kenya.

Production
The table below illustrates the rankings of Kenya's cement manufacturers, based on annual production figures, as of December 2016.

, Kenya's total annual cement production was 6.7 million tonnes, with national consumption of 6.3 million tonnes. The surplus production was aggressively marketed to regional neighbors.

See also

List of cement manufacturers in Tanzania
List of cement manufacturers in Uganda
List of companies and cities in Africa that manufacture cement

References

External links 
 Kenya: Cement industry news from Global Cement 

Cement companies of Kenya
Kenya
Cement manufacturers

Manufacturing in Kenya